Rohan Bhosale (born 30 September 1988) is an Indian first-class cricketer who plays for Railways.

References

External links
 

1988 births
Living people
Indian cricketers
Railways cricketers
Cricketers from Mumbai